is a railway station on the Nippō Main Line operated by JR Kyushu in Saiki, Ōita, Japan.

Lines

Layout 
The station, which is unstaffed, consists of an island platform serving two tracks, with a siding. The station building is a simple wooden structure in a basic Japanese style with a tiled roof. It serves only to house a waiting area and an automatic ticket vending machine. Access to the island platform is by means of a footbridge.

Adjacent stations

History
The Kyushu Railway was nationalised on 1 July 1907. Japanese Government Railways (JGR), designated the track as the Hōshū Main Line on 12 October 1909 and expanded it southwards in phases, with Saiki opening as the new southern terminus on 25 October 1916. On the same day, Azamui was opened as an intermediate station on the new track. On 15 December 1923, the Hōshū Main Line was renamed the Nippō Main Line. With the privatization of Japanese National Railways (JNR), the successor of JGR, on 1 April 1987, the station came under the control of JR Kyushu.

Passenger statistics
In fiscal 2015, there were a total of 26,402 boarding passengers, giving a daily average of 72 passengers.

See also
List of railway stations in Japan

References

External links

Azamui (JR Kyushu)

Railway stations in Ōita Prefecture
Railway stations in Japan opened in 1916